Mitchell Chapman also Mitch, Mark, Chappo, Horse (born 15 March 1983, in Sydney), educated at The King's School, Sydney and Brisbane Grammar School, is an Australian Rugby Union player for NSW Waratahs in the Super Rugby competition. Chapman can play at Blindside Flanker, Lock, or Number 8.

Chapman represented Australia at under 21 level in 2003 and 2004 and captained the Australian schoolboys in 2001.

Chapman made his Super Rugby debut for the Queendsland Reds in 2005.

A career highlight was his call up for the 2006 Wallabies Spring Tour to replace to injured Dan Vickerman. He also toured with the Wallabies in 2009. At the end of the 2007 Chapman transferred from the Queensland Reds to the ACT Brumbies.

He subsequently played with the NTT DoCoMo Red Hurricanes in Japan.

In January 2013, he signed with the Waratahs for the 2013 Super Rugby season. Chapman was expected to return to Australia to join the Waratahs in early February, following the completion of his Red Hurricanes season.

Life outside rugby
During school his years, Chapman played cricket and represented Queensland at under 17 and 19 age groups. He lists other interests as golf, fishing, surfing and bird watching.  In 2010 he completed a Bachelor of Commerce (finance) at the University of Southern Queensland.

References

External links
Waratahs profile

1983 births
Australian rugby union players
ACT Brumbies players
Queensland Reds players
New South Wales Waratahs players
New South Wales Country Eagles players
Barbarian F.C. players
Rugby union locks
Rugby union flankers
People educated at The King's School, Parramatta
Australian expatriate rugby union players
Expatriate rugby union players in Japan
Rugby union players from Sydney
Living people
NTT DoCoMo Red Hurricanes Osaka players
Australian expatriate sportspeople in Japan